The 1953 Wightman Cup was the 25th edition of the annual women's team tennis competition between the United States and Great Britain. It was held from August 1 through August 3, 1953, at the Westchester Country Club in Rye, New York, in the United States and played on outdoor grass courts. Colonel Duncan Macaulay was captain of the British team while Margaret Osborne duPont captained the U.S. team. The U.S. team won the competition 7–0.

References

Sources
 The Bud Collins History of Tennis: An Authoritative Encyclopedia and Record Book (pp. 528, 530), Bud Collins, New Chapter Press, 2010, .

1953
1953 in tennis
1953 in American tennis
1953 in British sport
1953 in women's tennis